Camptidius ophthalmicus is a species of beetle in the family Carabidae, the only species in the genus Camptidius.

References

Scaritinae